The 2020 California State Senate election was held on Tuesday, November 3, 2020, with the primary election scheduled for March 3, 2020. Voters in the 20 odd-numbered districts of the California State Senate elected their representatives. The elections coincided with the elections for other offices, including for U.S. President and the state assembly.

Predictions

Overview

Primary elections

General elections

Retiring incumbents 
 5th: Cathleen Galgiani (D–Stockton): Termed out of office
 13th: Jerry Hill (D–San Mateo): Termed out of office
 15th: Jim Beall (D–San Jose): Termed out of office
 17th: Bill Monning (D–Carmel): Termed out of office
 19th: Hannah-Beth Jackson (D–Santa Barbara): Termed out of office
 23rd: Mike Morrell (R–Rancho Cucamonga): Termed out of office

Results

District 1 

The 1st district stretches along the eastern edge of the state from the Oregon border to the Lake Tahoe area, wrapping around the Sacramento Valley along the northern Sierra Nevada to the eastern Sacramento suburbs. The incumbent is Republican Brian Dahle, who was elected in a special election with 53.9% of the vote in 2019.

Candidates 
Brian Dahle (Republican), incumbent state senator
Linda Kelleher (no party preference), retired teacher
Pamela Dawn Swartz (Democratic), businesswoman

District 3 

The 3rd district encompasses the northern San Francisco Bay Area and the Sacramento–San Joaquin River Delta regions. It includes parts of the North Bay, Wine Country, and the Sacramento Valley. The incumbent is Democrat Bill Dodd, who was elected with 58.1% of the vote in 2016.

Candidates
Bill Dodd (Democratic), incumbent state senator

District 5

The 5th district is centered on the Sacramento–San Joaquin River Delta and forms the gateway between the Central Valley, the San Francisco Bay Area, the Sacramento metropolitan area, and Gold Country. The incumbent is Democrat Cathleen Galgiani, who is term-limited and cannot run for reelection.

Candidates
Jesús Andrade (Republican), Stockton city councilman
Susan Eggman (Democratic), state assemblywoman for California's 13th State Assembly district
Kathleen A. Garcia (Republican), Stockton Unified School District board member
Mani Grewal (Democratic), Modesto city councilman
Jim Ridenour (Republican), law enforcement contractor, former Modesto Mayor

District 7

The 7th district is located in the East Bay east of the Berkeley Hills, taking in suburban and bedroom communities of San Francisco Bay Area. The incumbent is Democrat Steve Glazer, who was re-elected with 66.7% of the vote in 2016.

Candidates
Steve Glazer (Democratic), incumbent state senator
Julie Mobley (Republican), community volunteer
Marisol Rubio (Democratic), health care provider

District 9

The 9th district encompasses the northern East Bay, stretching along the eastern shores of San Francisco Bay and San Pablo Bay. The incumbent is Democrat Nancy Skinner, who was elected with 62.2% of the vote in 2016.

Candidates 
Nancy Skinner (Democrat), incumbent state senator

District 11

The 11th district encompasses the northern San Francisco Peninsula, including the consolidated city-county of San Francisco and northern San Mateo County. The incumbent is Democrat Scott Wiener, who was elected with 51.0% of the vote in 2016.

Candidates
Jackie Fielder (Democratic), member of the Three Affiliated Tribes and political activist
Erin Smith (Republican), entrepreneur
Scott Wiener (Democratic), incumbent state senator

District 13

The 13th district encompasses the San Francisco Peninsula and the northwestern reaches of Silicon Valley. The incumbent is Democrat Jerry Hill, who is term-limited and cannot run for reelection.

Candidates
Josh Becker (Democratic), former venture capitalist and former CEO of Lex Machina
Michael Brownrigg (Democratic), Burlingame city councilman
Alexander Glew (Republican), engineer
Sally Lieber (Democratic), former state assemblywoman for California's 22nd State Assembly district (2002–2008) and former mayor of Mountain View
Shelly Masur (Democratic), Redwood City councilwoman
Annie Oliva (Democratic), Millbrae city councilwoman, real estate agent
John H. Webster (Libertarian), software engineer

District 15

The 15th district encompasses most of Silicon Valley, centered around San Jose. The incumbent is Democrat Jim Beall, who is term-limited and cannot run for reelection.

Candidates
Nora Campos (Democratic), former state assemblywoman for California's 23rd State Assembly district (2010–2012) and California's 27th State Assembly district (2012–2016) and candidate for California's 15th State Senate district in 2016
Dave Cortese (Democratic), Santa Clara County supervisor
Ken Del Valle (Republican), U.S. Army staff sergeant
Tim Gildersleeve (no party preference), candidate for U.S. Senate in 2016 and 2018
Robert Howell (Republican), mechanical equipment manufacturer
Johnny Khamis (no party preference), San Jose city councilman
Ann M. Ravel (Democratic), former chair of Federal Election Commission

District 17 

The 17th district encompasses the extreme southern parts of the San Francisco Bay Area and northern Central Coast centering on the coastal Monterey Bay Area. The incumbent is Democrat Bill Monning, who is term-limited and cannot run for reelection.

Candidates 
Maria Cadenas (Democratic), executive director of Santa Cruz Community Ventures
John Laird (Democratic), former secretary of California Natural Resources Agency and former state assemblyman for California's 27th State Assembly district (2002–2008)
John M. Nevill (Democratic), rancher and Republican candidate for California's 30th State Assembly district in 2016
Vicki Nohrden (Republican), businesswoman and candidate for California's 29th State Assembly district in 2018

District 19 

The 19th district takes in the southern Central Coast, including all of Santa Barbara County and western Ventura County. The incumbent is Democrat Hannah-Beth Jackson, who is term-limited and cannot run for reelection.

Candidates 
Monique Limón (Democratic), state assemblywoman
Gary G. Michaels (Republican), telecommunications consultant
Anastasia Stone (no party preference), maternal health professional

District 21 

The 21st district takes in northern Los Angeles County and parts of the High Desert including, the Antelope Valley, Victor Valley, and most of the Santa Clarita Valley. The incumbent is Republican Scott Wilk, who was elected with 52.8% of the vote in 2016.

Candidates 
Warren Heaton (Democratic), immigration attorney and professor at College of the Canyons
Steve Hill (Democratic), businessman
Dana LaMon (Democratic), retired administrative judge
Kipp Mueller (Democratic), workers rights attorney
Scott Wilk (Republican), incumbent state senator

District 23 

The 23rd district encompasses a wide arc of the Inland Empire, circling clockwise from Rancho Cucamonga in the northwest to Menifee in the south. It also includes several resort communities in the San Bernardino Mountains and a sliver of the High Desert. The incumbent is Republican Mike Morrell, who is term-limited and cannot run for reelection.

Candidates 
Kris Goodfellow (Democratic), businesswoman and former journalist
Abigail Medina (Democratic), president of San Bernardino City Unified School District board
Rosilicie Ochoa Bogh (Republican), real estate agent and Yucaipa-Calimesa Joint Unified School District trustee
Cristina Puraci (Republican), president of Redlands Unified School District board
Lloyd White (Republican), Beaumont city councilman

District 25 

The 25th district encompasses the San Gabriel Mountains and its adjacent San Gabriel Valley foothill communities, anchored by Glendale and Pasadena. The incumbent is Democrat Anthony Portantino, who was elected with 57.8% of the vote in 2016.

Candidates 
Anthony Portantino (Democratic), incumbent state senator

District 27 

The 27th district takes in the Conejo Valley, parts of the San Fernando Valley, and a slice of the Santa Clarita Valley, including most of Los Angeles's western suburbs, as well as Simi Valley and Thousand Oaks. The incumbent is Democrat Henry Stern, who was elected with 55.9% of the vote in 2016.

Candidates 
Houman Salem (Republican), businessman
Henry Stern (Democratic), incumbent state senator

District 29 

The 29th district straddles the intersection of Los Angeles County, Orange County, and San Bernardino County. It encompasses the northern Santa Ana Valley, including western and central Anaheim, Fullerton, and Yorba Linda. The incumbent is Republican Ling Ling Chang, who was elected in a special election with 33.8% of the vote in 2018.

Candidates 
Ling Ling Chang (Republican), incumbent state senator
Joseph Cho (Democratic), candidate for California's 29th State Senate district in 2018 and former Cerritos city councilman
Josh Newman (Democratic), former state senator for California's 29th State Senate district (2016–2018)

District 31 

The 31st district takes in northwestern Riverside County, including Corona, Moreno Valley, and Riverside. The incumbent is Democrat Richard Roth, who was re-elected with 60.5% of the vote in 2016.

Candidates 
Richard Roth (Democratic), incumbent state senator

District 33 

The 33rd district encompasses a strip of the Gateway Cities, stretching from parts of eastern Los Angeles to the coast, including the Port of Long Beach and a significant portion of Long Beach itself. The incumbent is Democrat Lena Gonzalez, who was elected in a special election with 69.8% of the vote in 2019.

Candidates 
Lena Gonzalez (Democratic), incumbent state senator

District 35 

The 35th district takes in the inland portions of the South Bay stretching from Inglewood in the north down to the Port of Los Angeles and the San Pedro neighborhood of Los Angeles. The incumbent is Democrat Steven Bradford, who was elected with 53.5% of the vote in 2016.

Candidates 
Steven Craig Bradford (Democratic), incumbent state senator
Anthony Perry (American Independent), substitute teacher

District 37 

The 37th district encompasses central Orange County, centered on eastern Anaheim and Irvine. The incumbent is Republican John Moorlach, who was re-elected with 57.0% of the vote in 2016.

Candidates 
Katrina Foley (Democratic), mayor of Costa Mesa
Dave Min (Democratic), law professor at UC Irvine and candidate for California's 45th congressional district in 2018
John Moorlach (Republican), incumbent state senator

District 39 

The 39th district is centered on Downtown San Diego and mainly stretches along the city's coastline, including part of San Diego Bay.
The incumbent is Democrat State Senate President pro tempore Toni Atkins, who was elected with 62.5% of the vote in 2016.

Candidates 
Toni Atkins (Democratic), incumbent state senator

See also 
2020 United States elections
2020 United States House of Representatives elections in California
2020 California State Assembly election
2020 California elections

References 

State Senate
California Senate
California State Senate elections
Politics of California